Latha Athiyaman, also spelled Latha Adhiyaman, is an Indian politician who won a by-election in 2009 from the Thirumangalam constituency to become a member of the Tamil Nadu Legislative Assembly. A candidate of the Dravida Munnetra Kazhagam, she heavily defeated her All India Anna Dravida Munnetra Kazhagam rival, M. Muthuramalingam, by nearly 40,000 votes.

Athiyaman is the widow of M. C. S. A. Adhiyaman, another Member of the Legislative Assembly who had worked in the same constituency.

References 

21st-century Indian women politicians
21st-century Indian politicians
Dravida Munnetra Kazhagam politicians
Tamil Nadu MLAs 2006–2011
Year of birth missing
Possibly living people
Women members of the Tamil Nadu Legislative Assembly